The Meizu M2 is a smartphone developed by Meizu ((Chinese: 魅族科技有限公司), or simply "Meizu" (Chinese: 魅族; pinyin: Mèi Zú)) . It is part of Meizu's mid-range smartphone line and was released in July 2015 in China and internationally shortly after. The Meizu M2 is the successor of the Meizu M1 Note. Visually the biggest difference compared to the previous model is a new capacitive / physical home button and a separate notification LED. it has a polycarbonate unibody design with rounded back and edges along with a rather minimalist front. The M2 comes in three glossy colors (white, blue and pink) and matte grey.

See  also 
 Meizu

References

M2

Android (operating system) devices
Mobile phones introduced in 2015
Discontinued smartphones